Psilocybe ruiliensis is a species of psilocybin mushroom in the family Hymenogastraceae. Described as new to science in 2016, it is found in Yunnan province of southwest China. The species epithet, 'ruiliensis', is a reference to the location Ruili where the type collections were found. The type specimens were growing solitary to scattered in grasslands in which cows and horses had previously grazed.

Description 

 Cap:  in diameter; conic to almost plane, with or without umbo or small acutely papillate at the disk; brownish-yellow (often with reddish tinge); hygrophanous and translucently striate when moist, watery brown when wet; sometimes bruising blue when damaged or mature; cortinate white veil and sometimes small scales when young.
 Gills: Yellowish or beige when young, chocolate brown in age (gray-purple or purple tinge), with adnate to subsinuate or adnexed attachment; edges serrulate and slightly wavy.
 Spores: Brown with purple tinge (in water); ellipsoid to subhexagonal; smooth and slightly thick-walled, sometimes containing 1–2 oil drops; 9–11 by 6–7.5 µm.
Stem base with rhizomorphic white mycelium.
 Odor: Slightly grassy.
 Microscopic features: Larger hexagonal and subrhomboid basidiospores (9.6–12.0 by 6.4–8.4 μm); ventricose-lageniform cheilocystidia and pleurocystidia.

See also 

 List of psilocybin mushrooms
 List of Psilocybe species

References 

ruiliensis
Fungi described in 2016
Fungi of China